Silvio Szybisti (born 1 January 1962) is an Austrian ice hockey player. He competed in the men's tournament at the 1988 Winter Olympics.

References

1962 births
Living people
Olympic ice hockey players of Austria
Ice hockey players at the 1988 Winter Olympics
Sportspeople from Salzburg